In electoral systems, a wasted vote is any vote that is not for an elected candidate or, more broadly, a vote that does not help to elect a candidate. The narrower meaning includes lost votes, votes that are for a losing candidate or party. The broader definition of wasted votes includes lost votes and excess votes, votes for winning candidates in excess of the minimum needed to win. Both meanings when applied to ranked-vote systems include exhausted votes, as described below.

In plurality systems, wasted votes are the basis of the efficiency gap measure, where the shape of electoral districts (or the existence of them) can be quantified to show just how imperfect such a system is at allocating voter preferences. The efficiency gap has been called the most scrutinized method of measuring gerrymandering. 

Ranked voting almost always produces fewer wasted votes than the number of wasted votes in plurality systems because ranked vote systems offer multiple chances for a vote to count towards a winner. But ranked vote systems do sometimes produce exhausted ballots, ballots that are eligible for transfer but on which all the marked preferences have already been eliminated or elected. (These exhausted votes are counted as a wasted votes but if one or more of the marked preference have been elected, the voter may be nevertheless satisfied with the result.)

In case of proportional representation, the wasted votes are also called unrepresented votes. In PR elections representatives are elected at least in rough proportion to voter preferences, generally resulting in fewer wasted votes than in plurality voting. However, electoral thresholds for access to proportional representation can also produce wasted votes, with some examples reaching double-digits (including two cases of 45%). This waste is calculated by adding the percentage votes of lists whose votes tallies do not exceed the de jure threshold, which is often set at 5%. Barring being eligible for top-up seat through passing some other requirement, these parties are not represented. These figures do not include the waste produced by de facto thresholds, or district magnitude, which is higher the fewer seats there are. Despite suffering from wasted votes, small parties can sometimes wield disproportionate power in being necessary for the assembly of a coalition if they have any representation at all.. 

Even more broadly, a vote is said to be qualitatively wasted in the judgment of the voter when their vote has been needlessly added to a candidate who is less valued than a more valued and available candidate. Such may occur if a voter makes the wrong assessment and votes strategically for whom he thought was the least disliked of the candidates who he thinks have a chance to win, later learning that his most preferred candidate had had a chance anyway.

Rationale for wasted votes concept

An electoral system which reduces the number of wasted votes can be considered desirable on grounds of fairness or on the more pragmatic basis that a voter who feels their vote has made no difference may feel detached from their government or lose confidence in the democratic process.  The term "wasted vote" is especially used by advocates of systems like Evaluative Proportional Representation (EPR) in Section 5.5.5 in Proportional Representation, approval voting, the single transferable vote, two round systems or instant-runoff voting which purport to reduce the numbers of such votes.
Evaluative Proportional Representation not only wastes no votes quantitatively, it also claims to remove the needless qualitative wasting of votes.  Each EPR voter is invited to grade each of the candidate's suitability for office as either Excellent (ideal), Very Good, Good, Acceptable, Poor, or Reject (entirely unsuitable).  Each citizen is assured that their one vote will proportionately increase the voting power of the elected member of the legislature who received either their highest grade, remaining highest grade, or proxy vote.

The term may be considered pejorative by opponents of such systems. Their arguments may either suggest that in any voting system each vote is wasted (unless the result is decided by a single vote), or that no vote is wasted as each one sends a political signal which will be taken into account in preparation for the subsequent election.

In election campaigns, a leading candidate may appeal to voters who support a less-popular candidate to vote instead for the leading candidate for tactical reasons, on the basis that a vote for their preferred candidate is likely to be wasted.  In some electoral systems, it may be plausible for less-popular candidates to make similar appeals to supporters of more-popular candidates.  In a plurality voting system, the popular term "wasted vote", used non-technically, does not usually apply to votes for the second-placed candidate, but rather to votes for candidates finishing third or lower.  This is a reflection of Duverger's Law, i.e. the institutionalisation of a two-party system.

Example calculations of wasted votes
Consider an election where candidates A, B and C receive 6000, 3100 and 701 votes respectively.

If this is a plurality voting election for a single seat, Candidate A has a plurality of votes (actually a majority) and is therefore elected.  The wasted votes are:
 All 3801 votes for candidates B and C, since these "lost votes" did not elect any candidate
 In the wider definition, the 2899 "excess votes" for candidate A are wasted, since A would still have won with only 3101 votes. Therefore, 6700 out of 9801 votes are wasted.

If the same votes for A, B and C are cast in a d'Hondt method election for 2 seats, then the seats are split 8-4-0 for A-B-C. The wasted votes are:
 All 701 votes for party C, which won no seats.
 In the wide definition, also wasted are:
 399 votes for A, since A would still have won eight seats with only 5601 votes against 3100 and 701. (With 5600 votes for A, the last seat would go to C).
 299 votes for B, since only with 2800 votes would B lose the last seat to C.

A majority of votes are always wasted (in the wider sense) in a single-seat plurality election, unless there are exactly two candidates and the margin of victory is exactly one vote.  Multi-seat constituencies reduce the number of wasted votes as long as proportional representation is used. (When used with winner-take-all systems, as with the US Electoral College, multi-member constituencies may see the wasted vote reach or exceed 50%).

Consider an election where candidates A, B, C and D receive 6000, 3100, 2400 and 1701 votes respectively.

If this is an Instant-runoff voting election for a single seat, no one has a majority of votes so Candidate D is eliminated his or her votes are transferred. If 600 of them go to A, A has a majority and is declared elected. but instead if his votes did not produce a majority winner, then C would be eliminated (or B is C's vote total has surpassed B's) and either A or B (or C) would have a majority and would be declared a winner.
The wasted votes are:
 6600 at the most and potentially as few as 4300.

If this is a Single Transferable Voting election for two seats, quota (droop) is 4400. A has that in the first count and is elected. Transfer of A's surplus may give B a quota and victory, otherwise D is eliminated. It is likely that the second seat would be filled by someone with quota hence wasted votes would have to be less than a third of votes cast.
It two win seats by having quota, the wasted votes are:
 less than 4400.
It could be that the second seat is not filled by a candidate with quota, but by the candidate who is merely the most popular when the field of candidates thins to two. If so, the number of effective votes could be no greater than 4101, but that would assume a great number of exhausted votes. But even so, 
 the wasted votes could be no more than 4101.

See also
 Unrepresented vote
 Efficiency gap
 Spoilt vote

References

External links
 Example calculation for NC. Just copy the spreadsheet with its built-in formulas, add TX data, say, and you have the same analysis for TX.
 See here for the NYT map of gerrymandered states.
 See example explanation from the Brennan Center for Justice here.

Sources
 

Voting theory
Psephology